Douglas Patrick Oliver (born August 28, 1951) was the head basketball coach for the women's team at UC Irvine.  He previously served as special assistant to UCI athletic director Mike Izzi.

Head coaching record
Men's basketball

Women's basketball

References

External links
UC Irvine bio
Stanford bio
Idaho State bio

1951 births
Living people
American women's basketball coaches
Basketball coaches from California
Boise State Broncos men's basketball coaches
High school basketball coaches in the United States
Idaho State Bengals men's basketball coaches
Junior college men's basketball coaches in the United States
San Jose State University alumni
Sportspeople from San Jose, California
Stanford Cardinal men's basketball coaches
UC Irvine Anteaters men's basketball coaches
UC Irvine Anteaters women's basketball coaches
Utah Utes men's basketball coaches